Joseph Liboschitz, or Osip Jakovlevič Libošic; Осип Яковлевич Либошиц  (1783–1824) was a Russian physician and naturalist from Vilnius.

From 1798 he was a student at the University of Vilnius, obtaining his medical doctorate in 1806 at the University of Tartu. Subsequently, he practiced medicine in his hometown of Vilnius, later relocating to St. Petersburg, where he served as a court physician (from 1812) and personal physician to Tsar Alexander I (from 1822). In St. Petersburg, he founded a children's hospital.

Liboschitz was the first to provide a description of Rehmannia chinensis (synonymous with Rehmannia glutinosa), an important herb in traditional Chinese medicine.

Selected writings 
 Flore des environs de St.-Pétersbourg et de Moscou, 1811 – Flora of the environs of St. Petersburg and Moscow.
 Enumeratio fungorum quos in nonnullis provinciis Imperii Ruthenici, 1817.
 Naturgeschichte der Amphibien, 1817 (with Friedrich Tiedemann and Michael Oppel) – Natural history of amphibians

References 

1783 births
1824 deaths
Physicians from Vilnius
Vilnius University alumni
19th-century physicians from the Russian Empire
Naturalists from the Russian Empire